Jared C. Nicholson (born December 3, 1985) is the 58th Mayor of Lynn, Massachusetts.

Early life and education 
Nicholson was born on December 3, 1985, in Framingham, Massachusetts to Stephen and Lindsay Nicholson. He attended Lincoln-Sudbury Regional High School, graduating in 2004. He went on to graduate from Princeton University summa cum laude in the Princeton School of Public and International Affairs in 2008. He earn his Juris Doctor cum laude from Harvard Law School in 2014, where he was Executive Director of the Harvard Legal Aid Bureau. Nicholson is bilingual in English and Spanish.

Career 
Nicholson received the Skadden Fellowship out of Harvard Law School, and designed, launched, and led a new community economic development practice in Lynn, Massachusetts. Here he represented underserved communities in entrepreneurial and small business legal matters. He also helped make recommendations adopted by the Lynn City Council to support economic development in the city. In 2016 he was elected to the Lynn School Committee, serving three two year terms. During that time he helped develop a new initiative for students across the district to learn job skills after school, and founded the city's wrestling team. Since 2016, Nicholson, who wrestled at Princeton, has hosted a beach wrestling tournament every summer to support Lynn wrestling. Prior to being elected Mayor, Nicholson worked as a business lawyer for startups at Latham & Watkins and later as a law professor at Northeastern University, where he worked with and researched small businesses.

Mayor of Lynn 
In 2021 Nicholson was elected mayor of Lynn defeating City Council President Darren Cyr in all 28 precincts of the city. The Mayor also serves as the Chairperson for the School Committee for Lynn Public Schools.

Personal life 
Nicholson lives in Lynn with his wife, Katherine, and their son, Henry.

References

1985 births
Massachusetts Democrats
Politicians from Lynn, Massachusetts
Harvard Law School alumni
Princeton University alumni
Living people
21st-century American politicians